Macau is scheduled to compete at the 2017 World Aquatics Championships in Budapest, Hungary from 14 July to 30 July.

Diving

Macau has entered 4 divers (two male and two female).

Swimming

Macau has received a Universality invitation from FINA to send a maximum of four swimmers (two men and two women) to the World Championships.

Synchronized swimming

Macau's synchronized swimming team consisted of 12 athletes (12 female).

Women

 Legend: (R) = Reserve Athlete

References

Nations at the 2017 World Aquatics Championships
Macau at the World Aquatics Championships
2017 in Macau sport